Dance 2 Trance were a German techno duo composed of Rolf Ellmer and DJ Dag Lerner. They had a small number of hit singles in the mid-1990s and were associated with Jam & Spoon.

History

Musical career
DJ Dag and Jam El Mar met in 1990, when they decided to work together. Their first release was in the same year, a promo named "Dance 2 Trance" on the Suck Me Plasma label, the release contained two tracks ("Dance 2 Trance" and "We Came In Peace"). They got their commercial break in 1992 with the release of "Power of American Natives" with vocals from Linda Rocco. The song sold 250,000 records and was awarded a gold disc. A video was made for the song, and reached the mainstream networks such as MTV. The track later received remixes in 1997, 1998 and 2009. In 1992, they released their first album, Moon Spirits. Dance 2 Trance released another album in 1995 called Revival.

In 1995, both Dag & Jam El Mar decided to go their separate ways, with DJ Dag going solo and Ellmer concentrating more on his other side project, Jam & Spoon. In response, the German label Blow Up released a CD compilation album in 1996, consisting of thirteen Dance 2 Trance tracks from their five-year career.

Discography

Albums
 1992 - Moon Spirits
 1995 - Revival
 1996 - Works

Singles

References

External links
Discogs entry
Website of Dag Lerner

German electronic music groups
German trance music groups
German techno music groups
German musical duos
Electronic music duos